

188001–188100 

|-id=061
| 188061 Loomis ||  || Craig P. Loomis (born 1961), an American computing engineer with the Sloan Digital Sky Survey || 
|}

188101–188200 

|-id=139
| 188139 Stanbridge ||  || Dale R. Stanbridge (born 1962), a senior engineer at KinetX who worked as a Navigation Team Member for the New Horizons mission to Pluto || 
|}

188201–188300 

|-id=256
| 188256 Stothoff ||  || Maria M. Stothoff (born 1966), a Public Affairs Deputy Chief at the Southwest Research Institute who worked for the New Horizons mission to Pluto || 
|}

188301–188400 

|-bgcolor=#f2f2f2
| colspan=4 align=center | 
|}

188401–188500 

|-id=446
| 188446 Louischevrolet ||  || Louis Chevrolet (1878–1941), a Swiss race car driver and co-founder of the Chevrolet Motor Car Company in 1911 || 
|}

188501–188600 

|-id=502
| 188502 Darrellstrobel ||  || Darrell F. Strobel (born 1942), a research scientist at Johns Hopkins University who worked as a Co-Investigator for atmospheric science for the New Horizons mission to Pluto || 
|-id=534
| 188534 Mauna Kea ||  || Mauna Kea (4,207 m; meaning "White Mountain"), a dormant volcano on the island of Hawaii || 
|-id=576
| 188576 Kosenda ||  || Setsuo Kosenda (born 1955) established the Mikawa Astronomical Observatory, located in the Niigata region of Japan || 
|}

188601–188700 

|-id=693
| 188693 Roosevelt ||  || Theodore Roosevelt (1858–1919) was the 26th President of the United States and is one of the most admired leaders in American history. Among his many accomplishments he is well known for his conservationism, having established the US Forest Service, five National Parks, 18 National Monuments, and 150 National Forests. || 
|}

188701–188800 

|-bgcolor=#f2f2f2
| colspan=4 align=center | 
|}

188801–188900 

|-id=847
| 188847 Rhipeus ||  || Rhipeus (Ripheus), from Classical mythology. The Trojan warrior died fighting alongside his comrade Aeneas during the Trojan War. Rhipeus, the most just of the Trojans was not rewarded by the gods (Virgil). || 
|-id=867
| 188867 Tin Ho ||  || Tin Ho, or Tianhe District, is one of the fastest developing areas in Guangzhou, China. Many of Guangzhou's most iconic buildings are found in this district. Tin Ho is the Chinese name for the Milky Way. || 
|-id=894
| 188894 Gerberlouis ||  || Louis Gerber (1928–2021), a Swiss banker and amateur astronomer from Fribourg, who was the first treasurer of the Robert A. Naef Foundation, which operates the Observatory Naef Épendes, where this minor planet was discovered. || 
|}

188901–189000 

|-id=973
| 188973 Siufaiwing ||  || Siu Fai Wing (born 1946), a Chinese painter and sculptor || 
|-id=000
| 189000 Alfredkubin ||  || Alfred Kubin (1877–1959) is considered an important representative of expressionism || 
|}

References 

188001-189000